Glebe Football Club is a football club based in Chislehurst in the London Borough of Bromley, England.

History
The club was established by Rocky McMillan as Glebe Globetrotters in 1995, and was initially based in West Wickham. They were initially a youth team and were members of the Kent Youth League in 2013, when an adult team was formed and joined the Kent Invicta League. In 2016 the league merged into the Southern Counties East League, becoming its Division One. In 2015–16 they won the London Senior Trophy, beating Tooting Bec 4–1 in the final.

In 2016–17 Glebe won the Division One title, earning promotion to the Premier Division.

Ground
After joining the Kent Invicta League, the club played at Holmesdale's Oakley Road ground in Bromley. In 2014 they obtained a 25-year lease on Foxbury Avenue ground in Chislehurst, the former ground of Old Elthamians rugby club. The first match at the new ground on 18 July 2015 saw the club lose 3–2 to Canterbury City in front of a crowd of 42.

Honours
Southern Counties East League
Division One champions 2016–17
London Senior Trophy
Winners 2015–16

Records
Best FA Cup performance: Second qualifying round, 2017–18
Best FA Vase performance: Fourth round, 2019–20, 2021–22

See also
Glebe F.C. managers

References

External links
Official website

Football clubs in England
Football clubs in London
Association football clubs established in 1995
1995 establishments in England
Kent Invicta Football League
Southern Counties East Football League